Kirkbridea is a genus of flowering plants belonging to the family Melastomataceae.

It is native to Colombia.

The genus name of Kirkbridea is in honour of Joseph Harold Kirkbride (b. 1943), an American botanist who worked at the United States National Arboretum and as a curator at the Department of Agriculture's herbarium.
It was first described and published in Brittonia Vol.28 on page 141 in 1976.

Known species, according to Kew;
Kirkbridea pentamera 
Kirkbridea tetramera

References

Melastomataceae
Melastomataceae genera
Plants described in 1976
Flora of Colombia